The Matthew Isakowitz Fellowship is a non-profit program in the United States that provides paid internships and executive mentorship to exceptional undergraduate and graduate students seeking careers in commercial space. The fellowship was created in memory of Matthew Isakowitz, an American aerospace engineer and early contributor to the field of commercial spaceflight who died at the age of 29.

Motivation and overview 
The Matthew Isakowitz Fellowship Program seeks to connect exceptional students with the resources to become leaders in the commercial space industry, with the goal of instilling inspiration for commercial spaceflight into the next generation. Matthew Isakowitz was an aerospace engineer from Princeton University who worked at XPRIZE, SpaceX, and Astranis, and served as associate director of the Commercial Spaceflight Federation. He also worked on the New Horizons mission at the Johns Hopkins Applied Physics Laboratory, for which the minor planet 78867 Isakowitz was named. The fellowship was founded by Isakowitz's family, including his father Steve Isakowitz, and former colleague Sirisha Bandla in 2017.

The program offers students paid summer internships at commercial space companies (including SpaceX, Blue Origin, Virgin Galactic, etc.), travel stipends, and mentorship from notable aerospace leaders, including CEOs (e.g. Tom Mueller, George Whitesides, Mandy Vaughn), 10 astronauts (e.g. John M. Grunsfeld, Cadey Coleman, Sandy Magnus), former NASA administrators, JPL directors, and other experienced executives. Fellows are also paired with previous alumni, who act as peer mentors, and are flown out to the annual summit in Los Angeles, California to network, tour aerospace companies, and to meet industry leaders such as Elon Musk and Buzz Aldrin.

As of 2022, the fellowship program is partnered with the Brooke Owens Fellowship, Commercial Spaceflight Federation, and the Future Space Leaders Foundation.

Alumni 
As of 2022, the Matthew Isakowitz Fellowship has 169 alumni across six cohorts associated with 100+ different universities internationally. The program has become increasingly competitive, and nearly half of all fellows are associated with MIT, Stanford, or Georgia Tech alone.

Each year, hundreds of students from around the United States apply. Approximately thirty are selected through an evaluation of merit, passion for commercial spaceflight, and the embodiment of Isakowitz's qualities. This is done primarily by means of interviews and essay responses, with academic achievement and prior work in industry also weighted. Finalists are matched with host companies, who independently conduct interviews and award offers.

Inaugural Class of 2018 
 Adam Zachar, (University of Pennsylvania) — Accion
 Alex St. Clair, (CU Boulder) — The Spaceship Company
 Axel Garcia, (MIT) — Planet
 Brian Hardy, (University of Illinois Urbana-Champaign) — Altius Space Machines
 Calvin Lin, (Stanford University) — Astranis
 Chloe Downs, (Georgia Tech) — OneWeb
 Daniel Dyck, Embry-Riddle Aeronautical University — Blue Origin
 Dylan Cohen, (MIT) — XPRIZE
 Dylan Dickstein, (UCLA) — SpaceX
 Eva Abramson, (UCLA) — Lockheed Martin Ventures
 Golda Nguyen, (Georgia Tech) — Virgin Galactic
 Hailee Hettrick, (MIT) — Virgin Orbit
 Henry Ha, (Princeton University) — Virgin Orbit
 Ian Vorbach, (Stanford University) — Stratolaunch
 Jeremy Stroming, (MIT) — Blue Origin
 Joshua Etkind, (Tufts University) — Planetary Resources
 Leon Kim, (Columbia University) — LTA
 Max Goldberg, (University of Wisconsin) — Strike Force
 Padraig Lysandrou, (Cornell University) — SpaceX
 Samuel Albert, (Purdue University) — Moon Express
 Shayna Hume, (University of Miami) — Aerospace Corporation
 Sydney Dolan, (Purdue University) — NanoRacks
 Todd Sheerin, (MIT) — Millennium Space
 Yash Chandramouli, (Georgia Tech) — OneWeb

Class of 2019 
 Nina Arcot, (Princeton University) — Accion
 Parker Buntin, (MIT) — Virgin Orbit
 Manwei Chan, (MIT) — NanoRacks
 Konark Chopra, (Virginia Tech) — SpinLaunch
 Lilly Clark, (University of Southern California) — Aerospace Corporation
 Cameron Flannery, (UCLA) — Astranis
 Andrew Gatherer, (Stanford University) — Planet
 Nakul Gupta, (UCLA) — Lockheed Martin Ventures
 Shravan Hariharan, (Georgia Tech) — SpinLaunch
 Joshua Ingersoll, (Georgia Tech) — OneWeb
 Emily Jewell, (Stanford University) — Blue Origin
 Lewis Jones, (Caltech) — Millennium Space
 Gary Li, (UCLA) — Aerospace Corporation
 Kai Marshland, (Stanford University) — LTA
 Patrick Miga, (Georgia Tech) — Altius Space Machines
 Maya Naphade, (Princeton University) — Virgin Galactic
 Richard Nederlander, (Vanderbilt University) — XPRIZE
 Charlie Nitschelm, (University of New Hampshire) — Rocket Lab
 Victoria Nneji, (Duke University) — SpaceX
 Sahaj Patel, (Georgia Tech) — Accion
 Aaron Pickard, (Columbia University) — OneWeb
 Annika Rollock, (CU Boulder) — Blue Origin
 Anjali Roychowdhury, (Stanford University), SpaceX
 Madeline Vorenkamp, (Princeton University) — Astra
 Daniel Zanko, (Johns Hopkins University) — The Spaceship Company
 Jayden Zundel, (Stanford University) — OneWeb

Class of 2020 
 Hossain Ahmad, (Rutgers University) — Virgin Orbit
 Millen Anand, (Columbia University) — Planet
 Michael Barton, (North Carolina State University) — Stratolaunch
 Julia Bigwood, (Worcester Polytechnic Institute) — OneWeb
 Becca Browder, (MIT) — Made In Space
 Michael Brown, (Caltech) — The Spaceship Company
 Douglas Chin, (Princeton University) — Astra
 Thomas Collins, (University of New Hampshire) — Rocket Lab
 Alex Coultrup, (Florida Tech) — XPRIZE
 Harrison Delecki, (Georgia Tech) — Aerospace Corporation
 Bernadette Haig, (Stanford University) — ABL Space Systems
 Joshua Harvey, (Tufts University) — Roccor
 Michael Hauge, (Princeton University) — OneWeb
 Eric Hinterman, (MIT) — Blue Origin
 Meredith Hooper, (Princeton University) — SpaceX
 Amy Huynh, (UC Irvine) — Astra
 Megan Jones, (CU Boulder) — Iridium
 Abhishek Khandal, (Georgia Tech) — The Spaceship Company
 Jonathan Li, (Yale University) — Astranis
 Alex Liem, (CU Boulder) — Virgin Galactic
 Michelle Lin, (CU Boulder) — Blue Origin
 Michael Luu, (MIT) — Aerospace Corporation
 Patrick McKeen, (MIT) — Accion
 Max Newport, (Stanford University) — Relativity Space
 Cadence Payne, (MIT) — Millennium Space
 Calvin Phillips, (Purdue University) — OneWeb
 Daniel Shorr, (Stanford University) — Planet
 Mitchell Wall, (University of Wisconsin) — SpaceX
 Thomas White, (Stanford University) — Blue Origin
 Aaron Zucherman, (Cornell University) — Starburst Aerospace

Class of 2021 
 Michael Adeyi, (Yale University) — Stratolaunch
 Raghav Bhagwat, (Ohio State University) — Intuitive Machines
 Sidney Boakye, (George Mason University) — Rocket Lab
 Sam Boling, (University of Michigan) — Momentus
 Madeline Bowne, (Georgia Tech, Rutgers University) — Made In Space
 Lucy Brown, (Stanford University) — SpaceX
 Matthew Campbell, (MIT) — Aerospace Corporation
 Sarah Chu, (Georgia Tech, Smith College) — Analytical Space
 Mary Cooper, (Stanford University) — NanoRacks
 Anthony Danna, (CU Boulder), University of Oklahoma — Relativity Space
 Chava Friedman, (CU Boulder, Pitzer College — Commercial Spaceflight Federation
 Amelia Gagnon, (MIT, University of North Dakota) — SpaceX
 Maor Gozalzani, (Purdue University) — Virgin Orbit
 Kadin Hendricks, (Stanford University) — Roccor
 Khalil Jones, (University of Washington) — The Spaceship Company
 Ray Martin, (Rutgers University) — Blue Origin
 Halen Mattison, (Stanford University, North Carolina State University) — ABL Space Systems
 Thomas McBride, (Princeton University) — Roccor
 Kelly Reid, (University of Southern California, San Diego State University) — Axiom Space
 Thomas G. Roberts, (MIT, Princeton University) — Planet
 Roberto Rodríguez-Otero, (University of Puerto Rico) — Virgin Galactic
 Alay Shah, (UA Huntsville) — Blue Origin
 Miles Simpkins, (Princeton University) — Momentus
 Hannah Tomio, (MIT), Tohoku University, Carnegie Mellon University) — Made In Space
 Brianne Treffner, (Colorado School of Mines) — Millennium Space
 David Dezell Turner, (MIT) Des Moines CC) — Aerospace Corporation
 Gautham Viswaroopan, (UCLA, CU Boulder) — Aerospace Corporation
 Reiley Weekes, (UC San Diego) — ABL Space Systems
 Brit Wylie, (Caltech) — Rocket Lab
 Amber Yang, (Stanford University) — Astranis

Class of 2022 
 Maximilian Adang, (Caltech) — Redwire
 Adithya Arun, (University of Maryland) — SpaceX
 Loubensky Baine, (University of Central Florida) — Astra
 Randa Bassou, (Mississippi State University, Université Internationale de Rabat) — Redwire
 Carson Coursey, (Georgia Tech) — Aerospace Corporation
 Shane Cullen, (Embry-Riddle Aeronautical University) — SpaceX
 Flynn Dreilinger, (Stanford University) — SpaceX
 Allegra Farrar, (MIT, George Washington University) — Aerospace Corporation
 Michael Ganotaki, (Virginia Tech, Western University) — Virgin Galactic
 Grace Genszler, (Cornell University, Dartmouth College, Wheaton College) — Virgin Orbit
 Kyle Hampton, (University of Kentucky) — Rocket Lab
 Maya Harris, (Stanford University), Virgin Galactic
 Shaan Jagani, (UC Berkeley) — Blue Origin
 Emma Johnson, (Georgia Tech) — Planet
 Logan Kluis, (Texas A&M, MIT) — Aerospace Corporation
 Olivia Langenderfer, (Ohio State University) — Rocket Lab
 Maggie Lea, (Utah State University) — Axiom Space
 Erin Levesque, (University of Michigan) — ABL Space Systems
 Stephanie Manasterski, (University of Pittsburgh) — Virgin Orbit
 Daniel Nwachukwu, (Georgia Tech, USC Aiken) — Nanoracks
 Wilbert Ruperto-Hernández, (University of Puerto Rico) — Millennium Space
 Shan Selvamurugan, (Georgia Tech) — Blue Origin
 Ariel Shaver, (University of Arizona) — Hedron
 Blake Shepherd, (MIT) — Millennium Space
 Theo St. Francis, (MIT) — Relativity Space
 Fernando Tabares, (Purdue University, University of Pittsburgh) — Relativity Space
 Kevin Tong, (Princeton University)  — Lynk
 Alessandro Verniani, (CU Boulder, UC Irvine) — Virgin Galactic
 Rebecca Wang, (Stanford University, UT Austin) — Astranis
 Liam Ward, (Boston University) — Hedron

Class of 2023 
 Faraz Awan, (Princeton University) — Millennium Space
 Tycho Bogdanowitsch, (Columbia University) — Virgin Orbit
 Hailu Daniels, (University of Maryland) — Blue Origin
 Hillel Dei, (MIT) — Blue Origin
 Candace Do, (Princeton University) — Rocket Lab
 Catherine Dominic, (UT Austin) — Relativity Space
 Skylar Eiskowitz, (MIT, The Cooper Union) — Virgin Orbit
 Taylor Hampson, (Georgia Tech) — Stoke Space
 Madison Hobbs, (Harvey Mudd) — SpaceX
 Sydney Hsu, (Stanford University, Princeton University) — SpaceX
 Justin Kao, (University of Illinois Urbana-Champaign) — Relativity Space
 Grace Krahn, (Georgia Tech) — Sierra Space
 Samuel Kurtin, (CU Boulder, UT Austin) — Axiom Space
 Andrew Lesh, (Stanford University) — Venturi Astrolab
 Russell Lubin, (Case Western) — Firefly Aerospace
 Clara Ma, (MIT, Georgetown University) — Virgin Galactic
 Therese Malinowski, (Purdue University) — Rocket Lab
 Emily Matteson, (Cornell University) — Impulse Space
 Sydney Menne, (University of North Dakota) — Astra
 José Morel, (Georgia Tech, Binghamton University) — Redwire
 Katie Mulry, (UT Austin) — Ursa Major
 Hannah Nabavi, (UC Berkeley) — Redwire
 Mark Paral, (Purdue University) — Lynk
 Julia Proctor, (Cornell University) — Astranis
 Swati Ravi, (University College Dublin, Columbia University) — Sierra Space
 Rashmi Ravishankar, (MIT, IIT Madras) — Gravitics
 Benjamin Rich, (MIT) — Blue Origin
 Thomas Ridgeway, (San Diego State University) — Astra
 Charlotte Silver, (Duke University) — Astranis
 Ryan Smithers, (Yale University) — ABL Space Systems

References

Internships
Private spaceflight